Peter Stutchbury (born 1954, Sydney) is an Australian architect. His architectural expression has been described as "lyrical technologist". In 2015 Stutchbury was awarded the Australian Institute of Architects Gold Medal.

Peter Stutchbury graduated as an architect in 1978 at the University of Newcastle. Stutchbury lived and worked in regional Australia, Africa, Asia and Papua New Guinea, and also visited Europe and America. 
One of his early buildings was a church in Port Moresby, Papua New Guinea, completed in 1983. He established a joint practice with Phoebe Pape in 1991.

Projects

 Israel House, Paradise Beach, NSW, 1986–92
 Design Faculty, University of Newcastle, 1994 (with EJE architects)
 Sydney International Archery Park, Homebush Bay, 1998
 Clareville House, NSW, 1999
 Bay House, Watson Bay, NSW, 2001
 Life Sciences Research Link, University of Newcastle, 2001 (with Suters architects)
 Deepwater woolshed, Wagga Wagga, 2005
 Cliff Face House
 Land House

References

Further reading
 Drew, Philip et al.: Peter Stutchbury: Of People and Places: Between the Bush and the Beach, Pesaro, 2000
 Ga Houses 121 - Elements on Residence: Peter Stutchbury, ADA Editors, 2011
 Mceoin, Ewan: Under The Edge: The Architecture Of Peter Stutchbury, Architecture Foundation, 2011
 Stutchbury, Peter: Peter Stutchbury - Selected Projects,Pesaro, 2010

External links
Peter Stutchbury Architecture
Interview with Peter Stutchbury, video by the Historic Houses Trust (5:30min)

Living people
1954 births
Recipients of the Royal Australian Institute of Architects’ Gold Medal
New South Wales architects
Architects from Sydney